Federico Tobler Caballero (born 15 May 1992) is a Uruguayan footballer who plays as a defender. He last played for Bangor City.

Club career

In July 2019 he joined Real Tomayapo.

In January 2020 he joined Bangor City and in September he was appointed club captain. He left the club in February 2022.

Career statistics

Club

Notes

References

1992 births
Living people
Association football defenders
Uruguayan footballers
Uruguayan expatriate footballers
Uruguay youth international footballers
Italian footballers
Italian expatriate footballers
Uruguayan Segunda División players
Gibraltar Premier Division players
Danubio F.C. players
Peñarol players
Sud América players
St Joseph's F.C. players
Rocha F.C. players
Lincoln Red Imps F.C. players
Lynx F.C. players
Bangor City F.C. players
Expatriate footballers in Gibraltar
Uruguayan expatriate sportspeople in Spain
Italian expatriate sportspeople in Spain
Expatriate footballers in Spain
Uruguayan expatriate sportspeople in Bolivia
Expatriate footballers in Bolivia
Uruguayan expatriate sportspeople in Wales
Expatriate footballers in Wales
Cymru North players